The Red Book is a 1994 American experimental animated short film by renowned experimental filmmaker and theater/installation artist Janie Geiser. Her work is known for its ambiguity, explorations of memory and emotional states and exceptional design.

Geiser describes The Red Book as "an elliptical, pictographic animated film that uses flat, painted figures and collage elements in both two- and three-dimensional settings to explore the realms of memory, language and identity from the point of view of a woman amnesiac."

In 2009, it was named to the National Film Registry by the Library of Congress for being "culturally, historically or aesthetically significant."

References

External links
The Red Book essay  by Holly Willis at National Film Registry

 
 The Red Book on BCDB
 The Red Book essay by Daniel Eagan In America's Film Legacy, 2009-2010: A Viewer's Guide To The 50 Landmark Movies Added To The National Film Registry In 2009-10, Bloomsbury Publishing USA, 2011,  pages 186-189 

1994 films
1994 independent films
United States National Film Registry films
American independent films
Collage film
1994 animated films
1990s American films